Hans Schröder (4 September 1906 – 6 January 1970), nicknamed Hanne, was a German footballer who played as a forward and made one appearance for the Germany national team.

Career
Schröder earned his first and only cap for Germany on 18 April 1926 in a friendly against the Netherlands. The home match, which was played in Düsseldorf, finished as a 4–2 win for Germany.

Personal life
Schröder died on 6 January 1970 at the age of 63.

Career statistics

International

References

External links
 
 
 
 
 

1906 births
1970 deaths
Footballers from Berlin
German footballers
Germany international footballers
Association football forwards
Tennis Borussia Berlin players